{{Infobox person
| name               = Rana Kabbani
| native_name        = رنا قباني
| image              = 
| native_name_lang   = Arabic
| birth_date         = 
| birth_place        = Damascus, Syria
| death_date         = 
| death_place        = 
| nationality        = British Syrian
| other_names        = 
| occupation         = 
| years_active       = 
| known_for          = 
| notable_works      = Imperial Fictions: Europe's Myths of the Orient  'Letter to Christendom}}

Rana Kabbani (born 1958) is a British Syrian cultural historian, writer and broadcaster who lives in London. Most famous for her works Imperial Fictions: Europe's Myths of the Orient (1994) and Letter to Christendom (1989), she has also edited and translated works in Arabic and English. She has written for Spare Rib, the International Herald Tribune, The New Statesman, The Guardian, British Vogue, The Independent, Al Quds al Arabi, and Islamica. She has made and contributed to many television and radio programmes for the BBC, on subjects such as literature, music, minority rights, Islamic culture, food, feminism, women’s rights, painting, and British politics. She has spoken out against islamophobia, defining its historic roots in colonialism.

 Education and personal life 
Born in 1958 in Damascus, to Sabah Qabbani, Her paternal uncle was the renowned poet Nizar Qabbani. Her maternal family were also from a distinguished background: Kabbani's mother, Maha, was the niece of Said al-Ghazzi, former Prime Minister of Syria. In particular, Kabbani was influenced by her maternal grandmother Salwa Ghazzi, suffragette and pioneering feminist from an landowning liberal educated patrician family.

Kabbani spent her childhood and young adulthood in New York City, Damascus, Djakarta and Washington DC, where her father held a career as a diplomat and Syrian ambassador. She received her BA degree from Georgetown University, her MA degree from the American University of Beirut, and her Ph.D. in English from Jesus College, Cambridge. Her teachers there were Raymond Williams, Frank Kermode, and Lisa Jardine.

As the granddaughter of the Syrian Independence hero Tawfiq Kabbani, and the niece of the Syrian poet Nizar Kabbani, Rana Kabbani had both literature and activism in her blood from a young age. In the way that Nizar Kabbani’s feminism was inspired by the life and death of his sister, Kabbani's role as a progressive voice against imperialism was inspired by her experiences with growing anti-Muslim sentiment, her historical research and her family’s contribution. Her great uncle Fawzi Ghazzi wrote the first Syrian Constitution - taught as a document of pioneering liberalism - but was assassinated by agents of French colonialism for not accepting to mention their Mandate in Syria in it.

Kabbani married Palestinian poet Mahmoud Darwish twice - in 1976 and then again in 1978. They lived together in Beirut during the civil war; in Paris, and in Sidi Bou Said in Tunisia. They had no children together and divorced in 1982. In 1985, she married the British journalist Patrick Seale, and they had two children, Alexander and Yasmine.

 Writing career 
Kabbani began writing at an early age. She worked as an art critic in Paris, and later moved to London to work as a publisher's editor. Her first book, Europe's Myths of Orient: Devise and Rule, was published in 1985. In it, she evaluated orientalist perspectives and narratives, specifically focusing on erotic stereotypes and sexualization of the "exotic" in literature and painting. The work was translated into Arabic, Dutch, German, Turkish. It is taught at universities, and has never been out of print.

After the publication of Salman Rushdie's The Satanic Verses, there was a rise in anti-Muslim sentiment, which prompted Kabbani to write Letter to Christendom in 1989.

Kabbani's other works include her translations from the Arabic of Mahmoud Darweesh's 'Sand and Other Poems' (1985) and her editorship of The Passionate Nomad: Diaries of Isabelle Eberhardt (1987).

Kabbani has written for The Independent, The International Herald Tribune, The New Statesman, British Vogue, The Guardian. In 2011, she wrote about Syria in articles such as "Can Syrians Dare to Hope?" 
She is active on Twitter, which has led to controversy, as she is of a radical stance and uses brash language, in order to highlight political and social issues. She has been a fund raiser and a spokesperson for British charities that raise money for Syrian refugees, as well as for autism and mental illness. She is trilingual in Arabic, French and English, and has travelled extensively in Southeast Asia, Eastern Europe, Central Asia, Russia, the United States, Canada, Western Europe and Latin America.

 Works 
 Europe's Myths of Orient: Devise and Rule, London: Pandora, 1986. , 
 Women in Muslim society,  University College, Cork. Department of Sociology. 1992. 
 Letter to Christendom'', London: Virago, cop. 1989. ,

References 

1958 births
Living people
Writers from Damascus
20th-century Syrian women writers
20th-century Syrian writers
American University of Beirut alumni
Georgetown University alumni
Alumni of Jesus College, Cambridge